On 2 January 2023, a fire broke out at the New County Hotel in Perth, Scotland. It killed three people, one dog and injured 11 others.

Background 
The New County Hotel is a three star hotel on County Place in central Perth. The hotel had previously had a fire in August 2016. Set off by a malfunctioning dishwasher, guests were evacuated  but suffered no injuries. In an event unrelated to the incident on 2 January, a Mercedes-Benz car caught fire and burned up in November 2022. 

The New County Hotel is managed by the Edwin Hotels Group, which is owned by Rashid Hussain, a British businessman supposedly based in Dubai. Hussain previously owned the Melbourne Ardenlea, a hotel on the Isle of Wight that was shut  after an official report stated there was risk of “serious personal injury with the danger of fire, explosion, gas leaks and carbon monoxide”. The hotel was later reopened.

On 12 December 2022, a fire safety audit was carried out on the hotel by the Croner Group on behalf of the Scottish Fire and Rescue Service. The audit said that the measures at the time were not substantial enough; they listed 29 issues with the building. The report included issues with emergency doors, escapes and lighting. The hotel was ordered to fix the issues within 28 days.

Perth and Kinross council had previously issued three health and safety warnings to the hotel. The warnings highlighted problems with flooring and windows in the hotel.

Previous guests of the hotel had raised their own concerns about the safety of the hotel. Some said that the hotel had ignored previous warnings about risks, while others were concerned about fire safety due to cigarette butts being left in corridors. Deputy First Minister John Swinney had previously encouraged hotel guests to speak out about issues they found.

Fire death is relatively uncommon in Scotland. The fire at the New County Hotel was the country's first case of fire death in over five years. The last case was the Cameron House fire, which killed two people in December 2017.

Incident
Around 5:10 a.m. on 2 January 2023, reports were made to Police Scotland of a fire on the second floor of the New County Hotel in Perth. Emergency services arrived at the hotel around 5:12 a.m., including 60 firefighters in nine fire engines and 21 ambulances. Tayside Police evacuated the 16 people from the hotel and two people from the surrounding buildings. Citizens were asked to avoid the area around the hotel. Fires were fully extinguished by 6:30 a.m., but two fire engines remained on site to check the hotel.

Aftermath
So far, three people have been confirmed dead in the incident, as well as a dog. The Scottish Ambulance Service treated 11 people for minor injuries. The bodies of the people killed were taken away from the site in a private ambulance before noon. Perth and Kinross Council closed four roads around the hotel to prevent further harm to civilians, impacting traffic flow due to the hotel's central location. The three victims were named on 6 January by Police Scotland.

The manager of the New County Hotel filed an employment tribunal against Rashid Hussain following the fire.

Investigation
Police and Fire services started an investigation together into the incident after gaining control of the fire. Police stated that a report would be sent to the Procurator Fiscal service. The Deputy Leader of Perth and Kinross council, Cllr. Eric Drysdale, urged people to stay away from the scene so the investigation could be successful.

References

2023 fires in the United Kingdom
2023 in Scotland
Building and structure fires in Scotland
History of Perth, Scotland
January 2023 events in the United Kingdom